Gentianella tenella, the slender gentian or Dane's dwarf gentian, is a species of the genus Gentianella.

tenella